The Danish Landrace is a Danish breed of dairy goat.

History 

The oldest goat bones found in Denmark have been dated to 3400 BC. The Danish Landrace results from cross-breeding in the nineteenth century of indigenous local goats with imported German Braune Harzer Ziege and Swiss Saanen stock.

In 2018 the population was reported as 223 billies (males) and 1115 nannies (females).

Characteristics 

It is a medium-sized or large goat. Seven coat colours are recognised, including black and blue

Use 

It is used primarily for the production of milk, but is also raised for meat.

References

Further reading 
 

Dairy goat breeds
Animal breeds originating in Denmark
Goat breeds
